Tyrannosaurus rex is unique among dinosaurs in its place in modern culture; paleontologist Robert Bakker has called it "the most popular dinosaur among people of all ages, all cultures, and all nationalities". Paleontologists Mark Norell and Lowell Dingus have likewise called it "the most famous dinosaur of all times."<ref>Lowell Dingus and Mark Norell, Barnum Brown: The Man who discovered Tyrannosaurs rex, (Los Angeles: University of California Press, 2010, pg 94)</ref> Paleoartist Gregory S. Paul has called it "the  theropod. [...] This is the public's favorite dinosaur [...]  Even the formations it is found in have fantastic names like Hell Creek and Lance." Other paleontologists agree with that and note that whenever a museum erects a new skeleton or bring in an animatronic model, visitor numbers go up. "Jurassic Park and King Kong would not have been the same without it."  In the public mind, T. rex sets the standard of what a dinosaur should be.Tyrannosaurus was first discovered by paleontologist Barnum Brown in the badlands of Hell Creek, Montana, in 1902 and has since been frequently represented in film and on television, in literature, on the Internet and in many kinds of games. Brown himself, despite having discovered many other prehistoric animals for the American Museum of Natural History before and after, always referred Tyrannosaurus rex as "my favorite child". In Brown's own words, Tyrannosaurus rex was indeed "king of the period and monarch of its race... He is now the dominant figure in the Cretaceous Hall to awe and inspire young boys when they grow up."

General impact
On finding Tyrannosaurus, Barnum Brown wrote to Henry Fairfield Osborn, his employer and the President of the American Museum of Natural History, "Quarry No. 1 contains the [...] bones of a large Carnivorous  Dinosaur, not described by Marsh. ... I have never seen anything like it from the Cretaceous." On realizing that the find was unlike anything ever found before, Osborn, according to Robert Bakker, "sat down to construct a name that expressed the position of Mr. Rex in the ecosystem, this apex of carnivory. The name has to be evocative, it has to be beautiful, it has to be lyrical. You hear it once you remember it. [...] Tyrant. Lizard. King. Beautiful, short, you hear it once you remember it and it can be abbreviated. T. rex."

Osborn stated in 1905,Tyrannosaurus gained widespread public attention on December 30, 1905, when the New York Times hailed T. rex as "the most formidable fighting animal of which there is any record whatever," the "king of all kings in the domain of animal life," "the absolute warlord of the earth," and a "royal man-eater of the jungle." In 1906, Tyrannosaurus was dubbed the "prize fighter of antiquity" and the "Last of the Great Reptiles and the King of Them All."

In 1927, Charles R. Knight painted a mural incorporating Tyrannosaurus facing a Triceratops in the Field Museum of Natural History, establishing the two dinosaurs as enemies in popular thought; paleontologist Phil Currie cites this mural as one of his inspirations to study dinosaurs. Bakker said of the imagined rivalry between Tyrannosaurus and Triceratops, "No matchup between predator and prey has ever been more dramatic. It's somehow fitting that those two massive antagonists lived out their co-evolutionary belligerence through the very last days of the very last epoch of the Age of Dinosaurs."

Since then, popular culture has consistently depicted Tyrannosaurs as "King of the Dinosaurs" for decades. Portrayals have ranged from serving as an antagonist against whom human heroes could test their courage to an awe inspiring symbol of power, analogous to the lion's depiction as "King of the Beasts".

According to paleontologist and museum curator Mark Norell, Barnum Brown successor at the  American Museum of Natural History, Tyrannosaurus rex, "continues to be a subject of fascination, a popular icon, and probably the first dinosaur name imprinted in the minds of children globally. Besides all this, it is the inspiration for budding paleontologists worldwide. Long may the king reign."

Film appearancesTyrannosaurus rex has played a major role in many films, starting in 1918 with The Ghost of Slumber Mountain, written and directed by stop motion special effects pioneer Willis O'Brien.  The Ghost of Slumber Mountain is also, and most likely, the first film showing Tyrannosaurus facing Triceratops.

However, while Ghost was the first of  O'Brien's works to feature the dinosaur it was not the last time he would use the dinosaur, using it again in 1925, with the classic adaptation of Arthur Conan Doyle's novel The Lost World. Tyrannosaurus fossils were not so famous at the time of the publication of the novel (1912), and the only main villain dinosaur in the book was Allosaurus, with no appearance of Tyrannosaurus, but this 1925 film featured Tyrannosaurus anyway, for a more dramatic and spectacular effect. For his part, Bakker commented  that "Willis O'Brien was a scholarly man, anatomically literate he went to the American museum, he saw the skeletons, he thought about them, he saw Knight's paintings and the sculptures. He listened to Osborn's ideas and although T. rex has a bit part in the movie, T. rex influence is huge."

 O'Brien was again responsible for special effects in the 1933 monster movie King Kong, which featured a climactic battle between the giant ape and a Tyrannosaurus. This scene is credited with the film's success both in terms of cinematic experience and in securing financial backing. In a 2005 tongue in cheek mockumentary, "T. Rex: A Dinosaur in Hollywood," no one less than Kong himself explained why. "Well, I had to find a suitably impressive monster to showoff my great strength and ruthlessness. There was only one real choice!" 

In real life, film historian and Kong scholar Ray Morton agreed with the previous statement. According to Morton, RKO film studio wanted to halt production on King Kong on account of it going over budget. Merian C Cooper, Kong's creator, then showed the studio heads a 20 minute test reel he and his team had made. The footage was of T. Rex's fight with Kong and was this scene that convinced the studio heads that the film had to be made, regardless of costs.

O'Brien had not originally meant to create Kong, instead seeking to make a film about a lost island of dinosaurs wherein the T. rex would have featured in the climax. When this film, Creation was cancelled, O'Brien used the T. rex model he had made and reused it (along with other dinosaur models) for King Kong. The Tyrannosaurus model was made using a cast based on an early painting by Charles R. Knight. O'Brien stated that the battle between Kong and the Tyrannosaurus was one of the most technically difficult scenes in the film to animate. Many early films depicted Tyrannosaurus with an upright posture based on the current thinking of the time. Most of these films inaccurately portrayed the dinosaur with three prominent fingers on each hand like Allosaurus (though Tyrannosaurus had a third, vestigial finger, it would not have been noticeable at first glance); Walt Disney is reported to have informed dinosaur hunter Barnum Brown that "it looked better that way", and the creature was depicted as such as in the Igor Stravinsky's The Rite of Spring segment in the Walt Disney 1940 animated film Fantasia. Since that time, T. rex has appeared in a great number of "monster" films and educational documentaries. One of the first appearances which portrayed a proper posture and anatomy of Tyrannosaurus is the 1984 short Prehistoric Beast, fully conceived and made by Phil Tippett by means of his so-called go motion technique.

One of the most iconic depictions of Tyrannosaurus in film was in 1993's Jurassic Park, where dinosaurs, including T. rex, are brought back to life using blood from fossilized mosquitoes. In the film, the dinosaur breaks free of its theme park enclosure, and proceeds to roam the park after attacking the visitors and killing one (a lawyer). In the film's finale, the Tyrannosaurus (also known as Rexy by fans) indirectly saves the main characters by killing the Velociraptors, who had been hunting them through the visitor center. The popularity of T. rex has long had a reciprocal effect on dinosaur science; the popularity of Jurassic Park factored into the discovery of the dinosaur genus Scipionyx; fossils of this genus had lain in storage in a basement in Italy until the film's release attracted attention from the fossil owner. Two Tyrannosaurus appeared again as primary antagonists in The Lost World, the sequel to Jurassic Park. In Jurassic Park III, it appeared briefly in a confrontation against the main antagonist, Spinosaurus, only to be killed by it. In a twist, the same Tyrannosaurus from the original 1993 film reappears as the climactic protagonist in Jurassic World (2015), making an entrance by smashing through a Spinosaurus skeleton. Against the odds, it defeats the Indominus rex, with the assistance of a Velociraptor, dubbed "Blue," and a Mosasaurus. This specific Tyrannosaurus reappears again in Jurassic World: Fallen Kingdom and Jurassic World: Dominion.Tyrannosaurus is one of the three dinosaur types whose physical characteristics were combined by the designers at Toho, to create the Japanese monster Godzilla; the other two dinosaurs were Stegosaurus and Iguanodon.

Among other appearances, Tyrannosaurus has made major appearances in many other films, including Dinosaurus! (1960), The Last Dinosaur (1977), The Land Before Time and its direct-to-video sequels (1988–2016), We're Back! A Dinosaur's Story (1993), Toy Story (1995), Night at the Museum (2006), Meet the Robinsons (2007), Ice Age 3: Dawn of the Dinosaurs (2009), and The Good Dinosaur (2015). The IMAX 3D film T-Rex: Back to the Cretaceous (1998) featured a Tyrannosaurus in various time travel sequences, as well as its discoverer, Barnum Brown.

Some Japanese animated films have a Tyrannosaurus as a main protagonist (You Are Umasou, 2010), as the main villain (Daikyouryu no Jidai, The Age of the Great Dinosaurs, 1979), as a minor antagonist (Magic Tree House, 2011), or as a neutral character (Doraemon: Nobita's Dinosaur, 1980, as well as its 2006 remake).Dinosaur Island (2014 film) features a feathered Tyrannosaurus, reflecting more modern understanding of the dinosaurs' appearance.

Television appearancesTyrannosaurus has starred in several television series, including children's programs, both in those intended as fiction, and, more recently, documentaries.

In the Mighty Morphin Power Rangers television series from 1993-1995, Jason who was the Red Ranger, powered the Tyrannosaurus Zord. His red Power Ranger outfit resembled that of a tyrannosaurus rex as well. He also yelled "Tyrannosaurus!" when he morphed which was fairly common throughout the television series. The Zord itself was depicted in the now-outdated reconstruction, with its tail dragging on the ground. This is due to the Zord being portrayed by a man in a suit.

In the American children's children's show Barney & Friends, Barney is a stylized Tyrannosaurus rex. In the Australian children's show The Wiggles, the character "Dorothy the Dinosaur" is a stylized adaptation of a Tyrannosaurus. Some Tyrannosaurus characters appear in Dinosaur Train, most prominently Buddy.Tyrannosaurus was one of several dinosaurs featured in the 1974 Doctor Who adventure Invasion of the Dinosaurs, starring Jon Pertwee. A sleeping juvenile is also seen on the Silurian ark in "Dinosaurs on a Spaceship". A time-travelled Tyrannosaurus is seen in London in "Deep Breath".

In 1985 the 1984 Prehistoric Beast short was served to Robert Guenette to direct a full length TV documentary titled Dinosaur!, for which Phil Tippett made new Tyrannosaurus go motion sequences (chasing Hadrosaurus) in addition to those he made for Prehistoric Beast (where Tyrannosaurus was chasing Monoclonius).

In the 1985 anime Transformers the popular Autobot, Grimlock, transformed into a mechanical Tyrannosaurus and in later incarnations a "Megaraptor". In the sequel series, Beast Wars, Megatron, the leader of the Predacons, turned into a techno-organic Tyrannosaurus.

In the cartoon The Terrible Thunderlizards, 'Mr. T' plays a Tyrannosaurus rex called Mr. T-rex. General Galapagos, the boss of the Thunderlizards, is also a Tyrannosaurus.

The T-rex plays recurring supporting roles in Dinosaurs (Roy Hess, Earl Sinclair's friend and the Sinclairs' neighbor), Dinosaucers (Genghis Rex, who is the leader of the Evil Tyrannos), Extreme Dinosaurs (T-Bone, the leader of the heroic group of the same namesake) as well as the anime television series Dinozaurs (as "Dino Tyranno" and his short-lived evil counterpart "Drago Tyran").

In Land of the Lost a Tyrannosaurus rex played the villain in both the 1974 series (as "Grumpy") and the 1991 version (as "Scarface", who had a scar covering his right eye).

In the Ben 10 episode "Washington B.C.", Dr. Animo brings back a Tyrannosaurus with its skeleton.

In Dino-Riders, the main villain Lord Krulos uses a Tyrannosaurus as his mount.

In the Japanese TV series Dinosaur War Izenborg, a Tyrannosaurus named Ururu (renamed "Tyrannus" in the US re-edit Attack of the Super Monsters) served as the main villain for the first half of the series.

A Tyrannosaurus named Tyrannor was the main antagonist of Dink the Little Dinosaur.

An anthropomorphic Tyrannosaurus named Johnny T. Rex is one of the villains in the Disney Afternoon series Darkwing Duck.

Documentaries and quasi-documentaries featuring Tyrannosaurus have included Dinosaur!, Dinosaur Planet, Prehistoric Park, T. Rex: New Science, New Beast, The Truth About Killer Dinosaurs, Walking with Dinosaurs, When Dinosaurs Roamed America, Sea Monsters - A Walking with Dinosaurs Trilogy, Valley of the T-Rex, Dinosaurs Decoded, Bizarre Dinosaurs, Giant Monsters, Animal Armageddon, Jurassic Fight Club, Dinolab, T-rex: Warrior or Wimp?, T. Rex: A Dinosaur in Hollywood, Dinosaur Revolution, Prehistoric Planet, The Last Dragon, and Planet Dinosaur, in which it only appears as a skeleton image.

Chomper from The Land Before Time series, as well as Red Claw from the TV series, and Sharptooth from the original film are all tyrannosaurs.Tyrannosaurus-themed mecha have appeared in the Super Sentai series since Kyoryu Sentai Zyuranger in Shogozyu Tyrannosaurus, V-Rex of Mirai Sentai Timeranger, Bakuryu Tyranno of Bakuryuu Sentai Abaranger, Gozyu Rex of Kaizoku Sentai Gokaiger, Gabutyra of Zyuden Sentai Kyoryuger and recently Tyramigo  of Kishiryu Sentai Ryusoulger. They also appear in their respective Power Rangers adaptations in Season One of Mighty Morphin' Power Rangers, Power Rangers Time Force, Power Rangers Dino Thunder, Power Rangers Super Megaforce, Power Rangers Dino Charge and Power Rangers Dino Fury.

A CGI animated Tyrannosaurus rex named Tina Rex is a bully in Gumball's school in the 2011–2019 animated series on Cartoon Network, The Amazing World of Gumball.

In Genndy Tartakovsky's Primal, a female Tyrannosaurus develops a bond with a Neanderthal male. The series revolves around them struggling to survive in a prehistoric-like world.

In Dinosaur King the main Tyrannosaurus is named Terry.

Literature

In literature, a dominant representation of Tyrannosaurus since 1990 has been that of Michael Crichton's, as seen in the novel Jurassic Park and its sequel The Lost World (homage title to the 1912 novel by Arthur Conan Doyle, about scientists discovering a South American plateau where dinosaurs still exist). Its skeleton was also used to illustrate the covers of these books.

A Tyrannosaurus rex was the protagonist of the children's book We're Back! A Dinosaur's Story (later adapted into a feature-length film of the same name). Tyrannosaurus has also been featured in the novel Primeval: Extinction Event, by Dan Abnett.

Other appearancesTyrannosaurus has appeared in many media and is perhaps one of, if not the most widely used dinosaurs. Various incarnations of, and creatures based on T. rex have appeared in video games, and several game series have featured Tyrannosaurus a centerpiece. These include 3D Monster Maze, the Dino Crisis/Dino Stalker line, various Jurassic Park tie-in games, the Turok game series, Tomb Raider, the Zoo Tycoon series, the survival game Ark: Survival Evolved, the simulation games Saurian and The Isle, and Super Mario Odyssey.
Numerous models and children's toys depicting Tyrannosaurus have been produced, particularly in promotion of the Jurassic Park films. The Carnegie Museum Dinosaur Collection toy line released three versions of the dinosaur, with the second brought in line with more modern scientific understanding. Sinclair Oil ads from the 1950s frequently featured T. rex, and products from radio-controlled helicopter models to a rifle cartridge (the .577 T-Rex) have been named after the dinosaur. In music, the popular 1970s glam rock band T. Rex took their name from the famous dinosaur.

In Banjo-Tooie, Humba Wumba turns Banjo and Kazooie into a T. rex for 2 different growth stages in the world Terrydactyland.

In Wario World, Wario must fight DinoMighty, the Tyrannosaurus boss of Excitement Central.

In the F-Zero series of video games, F-Zero racer Bio Rex is a Tyrannosaurus whose machine is the Big Fang.

In the Calvin and Hobbes comics, fantasy sequences often featured Tyrannosaurus rex. In one story arc, in which Calvin writes a school paper on the T. rex predator/scavenger debate, he argues that T. rex was a predator because "They're so much cooler that way." T. rex is also featured as the protagonist in the long-running webcomic Dinosaur Comics by Ryan North. Various T. rex have featured in stories published in the British comic 2000AD.

Ursula Dubosarsky's picture book, simply called Rex and illustrated by David Mackintosh, concerns a pet lizard that assumes the proportions of a T. rex in the imagination of a series of children.

In Pokémon Gold and Silver, the Pokémon Tyranitar is named after the Tyrannosaurus, while its design resembles Godzilla, which was inspired by T. rex. In Pokémon X and Y, there is an evolution family consisting of Tyrunt and Tyrantrum both of which are based on Tyrannosaurus. Their bodies are differently colored.Tyrannosaurus rex was also one of the first superheroes in Marvel Comics series.

In Super Mario Odyssey, a T-Rex'' is featured as an enemy in some areas of the game. The player can control it using Cappy like other enemies, but unlike most they can only control it for a limited time. the T-Rex is not used for many puzzles despite being in many areas in the game.

Former WWE Chairman and CEO Vince McMahon had a T. Rex skull hanging on his wall, a gift from his son-in-law Triple H. The skull is prominently visible whenever WWE programming films in his office, such as during the 2020 edition of Money in the Bank.

See also

 Cultural depictions of dinosaurs
 Timeline of tyrannosaur research

References

Dinosaurs in popular culture
Popular culture
Fiction about dinosaurs
Articles containing video clips